The Kerry county football team represents Kerry in men's Gaelic football and is governed by Kerry GAA, the county board of the Gaelic Athletic Association. The team competes in the three major annual inter-county competitions; the All-Ireland Senior Football Championship, the Munster Senior Football Championship and the National Football League.

Kerry's home ground is Fitzgerald Stadium, Killarney. The team's manager is Jack O'Connor.

Kerry was the fourth Munster county both to win an All-Ireland Senior Football Championship (SFC), as well as to appear in the final, following Limerick, Tipperary and Cork. The team last won the Munster Senior Championship in 2022, the All-Ireland Senior Championship in 2022 and the National League in 2022.

History
Kerry is the most successful team in football history, having won the All-Ireland Senior Football Championship (SFC) on 38 occasions and the National Football League 21 times. The team also holds a number of distinctive records in football championship history. It has contested 59 All-Ireland SFC finals, the next highest participator being Dublin with 36 appearances. Kerry's record in the All-Ireland SFC involves having played 30 of the 31 other counties, with only Kilkenny being the exception.

The traditional Irish game of caid, from which modern football developed, was especially popular in Kerry. The GAA was formed in 1884 and codified the modern rules of the game, which were soon adopted in Kerry clubs such as Laune Rangers. Despite this, the county team did not win an All-Ireland SFC in the nineteenth century. The 1903 title was the first won by Kerry, with the county defeating London in the final at a time when London was given a bye to that stage of the championship; Kerry's overall exceptional success in the game began in this period.

The Kerry team of the 1970s and 1980s was considered to be the greatest in the history of football and its manager (Mick O'Dwyer) one of the greatest of all time. Of the twenty All-Ireland SFC finals held during those two decades, Kerry participated in twelve, with victory coming on nine occasions. During this time most other finals were won by Dublin, and there was a major rivalry between the two counties, especially during the 1970s and 1980s. In 1982, Kerry came within one minute of winning an unprecedented fifth consecutive All-Ireland SFC title, only for a late goal by Offaly's Séamus Darby to give the title to Offaly. This goal was voted third in a poll to find the Top 20 GAA Moments.

Towards the end of the 1980s, Kerry went into decline and did not appear in an All-Ireland SFC final for eleven years, between 1986 and 1997. The 1997 victory, however, marked the beginning of a revival for Kerry which spanned roughly the first decade of the 21st century. Of the fifteen All-Ireland SFC finals between 1997 and 2011, Kerry contested ten and won six, including five titles in the 2000s.

Kerry reached the 2002 All-Ireland Senior Football Championship Final. Its opponent, Armagh, had lost its two previous appearances at this stage of the competition. Kerry led at half-time, but not at full-time, giving a first All-Ireland title to Armagh. Kerry later got rid of its manager Páidí Ó Sé, All-Ireland SFC winning manager in 1997 and 2000 and All-Ireland SFC winning player eight times between 1975 and 1986. Ó Sé fell ill and died some years later, at the age of 57.

Kerry reached the 2005 All-Ireland Senior Football Championship Final. Its opponent, Tyrone, had lost two of its three previous appearances at this stage. Tyrone did not lose this one.

In 2006 and 2007, Kerry won consecutive All-Ireland SFC titles (the first team to do so since Cork in 1989 and 1990).

Kerry reached the 2008 All-Ireland Senior Football Championship Final. Its opponent, Tyrone, defeated it once more. By reaching the same stage in 2009, Kerry became only the third team to reach six consecutive All-Ireland SFC finals (a feat last achieved by Dublin between 1974 and 1979).

Kerry quietly exited the 2010 and 2012 All-Ireland SFCs at the quarter-final stage, losing to Down and Donegal respectively, while Dublin defeated Kerry in dramatic fashion on the last kick in the 2011 final. Dublin were also responsible for their exit at the semi-final stage in 2013 in a closely contested classic match. Kerry won its 37th All-Ireland SFC title in 2014 against Donegal, winning by a margin of 2–09 to 0–12. This win was notable due to Kerry's fairly young squad and a belief that Kerry were becoming unable to produce the talent they once had, after pundit Joe Brolly had suggested as such. In the aftermath of the game, Kerry player Kieran Donaghy gave a famous interview in which he directly referenced Brolly's claim that the 'production line' in Kerry had stopped, with Donaghy speaking directly to the camera and asking 'Well, Joe Brolly, what do you think of that?'. The next year, Kerry again reached the All-Ireland SFC final, only this time to be comfortably beaten by Dublin, 0–12 to 0–9. The next two years saw Kerry bow out at the semi-final stage. In 2016, the team was narrowly defeated by Dublin in a thrilling encounter, while in 2017 the team was beaten by Mayo in a replay – its first championship defeat to Mayo in 21 years. Kerry crashed out of the 2018 championships at the group stages of the new Super Eights format. However, in 2019 Kerry reached their first All-Ireland SFC final for four years. The first match was drawn on a scoreline of 1–16 to 1–16, with the replay fixed for 14 September.

Kerry's 2009 title was also notable since it followed the return of Tadhg Kennelly. The son of Tim Kennelly, a five-time All-Ireland winner with Kerry, and a former talented underage player with the county, he had joined the AFL's Sydney Swans and become the first Irish player to win an AFL Premiership in 2005 (the Swans' first in 72 years). Following Tim's death later that year, he elected to return to Ireland and rejoin Kerry in 2009 in pursuit of winning an All-Ireland of his own playing for the county. After he succeeded and became the first player to have won an All-Ireland and an AFL Premiership, he returned to Australia and the Swans to finish his career.

Kerry reached the 2011 All-Ireland Senior Football Championship Final, where its opponent was Dublin (appearing at this stage for the first time in 16 years). In what was a memorable ending to the game, Kerry conceded a free and Dublin goalkeeper Stephen Cluxton sent the ball over Kerry's bar to consign The Kingdom to defeat.

Kerry contested the 2019 All-Ireland Senior Football Championship Final, attempting to prevent Dublin from achieving five consecutive titles (the record Offaly denied Kerry in 1982). Kerry, however, failed to stop Dublin from achieving the record. Kerry had also been the team to set the record going, after losing the 2015 All-Ireland Senior Football Championship Final to Dublin as well.

Shortly after winning the 2020 National Football League, Kerry's footballers were knocked out of the 2020 All-Ireland Senior Football Championship after a defeat by Cork.

Kerry won its 38th, and most recent, All-Ireland SFC title in 2022 against Galway, winning by a margin of 0–20 to 0–16.

Support
In January 2003, Páidí Ó Sé famously described Kerry supporters "fucking animals". More than 15 years later, former Tyrone footballer Seán Cavanagh, recalling his own experiences of the Kerry supporters, agreed that Ó Sé had been right. Cavanagh mentioned a 2012 match at Fitzgerald Stadium when an injury meant he could not play. "Then you sit in the stand, and you realise Páidí Ó Sé was right. They are absolute animals when the game is on". Cavanagh also questioned their "patronising" attitude towards their opponents. "It was strange that day. Their fans were riled on the terraces. They beat us well. They beat us out the gate, and you thought, 'Jesus, these guys are absolute dogs'. And then I remember as we were leaving the changing room, walking out onto the team bus there were hundreds of Kerry supporters, all clapping us. Either side of us, as we were walking through. They were back slapping us, 'ah youse are great lads', and all this. To me, it seemed a wee bit patronising".

Kerry has its own supporters' club, which Seán Kelly established in 1987. Another supporters' club exists in Dublin for those from the county who live in the capital city.

Current management team
Appointed 4 October 2021:
Bainisteóir: Jack O'Connor (Piarsaigh Na Dromada)
Roghnóirí: Micheál Quirke (Kerins O'Rahilly's), Diarmuid Murphy (Dingle)
Later additions:
Head coach: Paddy Tally, as of 8 October 2021
Performance coach: Tony Griffin
Head of athletic development: Jason McGahan
Strength and conditioning coach: Arthur Fitzgerald
Sports science: John Barry
Statistics: Colin Trainor
Video: John C. O'Shea
Team doctors: Dr Mike Finnerty and John Rice
Physiotherapists: Jimmy Galvin and Paudie McQuinn
Masseurs: Harry O'Neill and Liam O'Regan
Goalkeeping coach: Brendan Kealy
Nutritionists: Kevin Beasley and Gavin Rackard (Rackard is also performance nutritionist for Connacht Rugby)
Equipment: Colm Whelan
Equipment/in-house referee: Brendan Griffin

Current panel

INJ Player has had an injury which has affected recent involvement with the county team.
RET Player has since retired from the county team.
WD Player has since withdrawn from the county team due to a non-injury issue.

Managerial history

Kerry — like Cork, Dublin and Tyrone — traditionally appoints managers from inside, rather than seeking a "foreign" appointment.

Players

Notable players

Dynasties
Kerry has several noted families who have competed at the sport's highest level; these include the Ó Sés, the Sheehys, the Spillane–Lynes and the Walshes and Kennellys; Frank and John O'Keeffe; Jack and Aidan O'Shea; Ogie and David Moran; Con and Jim Brosnan; Ned and Maurice Fitzgerald; John Egan and his son (the one who got away).

Records
Colm Cooper was the highest scoring player in the All-Ireland Senior Football Championship until 2019 when Cillian O'Connor of Mayo surpassed the record against Kerry during a defeat in Killarney. Cooper had taken the record from fellow Kerryman Mikey Sheehy.
Mick O'Dwyer is the team's top scorer in National Football League history, finishing his career with 19–313 (370) in that competition. As of 2021, he remained in the top ten all-time scorers in that competition, though he had been passed by numerous players including Ronan Carolan of Cavan, Mattie Forde of Wexford, Steven McDonnell of Armagh, Conor McManus of Monaghan, Brian Stafford of Meath and David Tubridy of Clare.
Beginning with Páidí, the Ó Sé family had at least one member play a part in all 22 All-Ireland SFC finals that Kerry participated in between 1975 and 2014.
Pat Spillane received nine All Star Awards during his career, a feat matched by no other footballer.
Tadhg Kennelly became the first (and thus far only) holder of both an AFL Premiership medallion and a Senior All-Ireland Championship medal, the highest respective possible honours in the sports of Australian rules football and Gaelic football, in addition to winning a GAA Medal as Irish Player of the Series in the International Rules Series.  He was the third former AFL player to win the Sam Maguire Cup, following Dermot McNicholl in 1993 and Brian Stynes in 1995.

All Stars

Colours and crest

The team's current crest, which came into use in 2012, features design elements that represent the county: Kerry's people, landscape, flora, fauna and artistry.

County name – A bold decorative Celtic-style Ciarraí brand featuring a crowned C which pays homage to the county's moniker, 'The Kingdom'.

Kerry's people – St Brendan and his epic voyage: an inspiring tale of bravery, skill and innovation. The naomhóg (a craft associated with the coastal communities around Kerry) is propelled by a sail featuring a Celtic cross – the symbol of the GAA.

Kerry's fauna – Red Deer (Fia Rua): Ireland's largest wild animal whose only remaining native herd is found on the slopes of Torc and Mangerton. These animals are believed to have had a continuous presence in Ireland since the end of the last Ice Age ( 10,000 BC) and are steeped in folklore. It is said that 'Tuan', the King of the Deer, was given rights of free passage by Fionn McCool to the mountains of Kerry and that his blood line lives on in the present herd.

Kerry's landscape – Skellig Michael's iconic silhouette rising out of the Atlantic Ocean. A designated UNESCO World Heritage site and famous around the globe.

Kerry's flora – Killarney woodland fern that thrives in wild exotic places; an evocation of majestic mountains, valleys and hills.

Kerry's artistry – A background pattern of concentric circles inspired by the gilding on the Ballinclemisig 'gold box' (part of the 'Kerry gold hoard' in the National Museum) and by Bronze Age stone carvings found all over Kerry.

Kerry's birdlife – Storm Petrel (An Guairdeall): Kerry plays host to the largest numbers of this species anywhere in the world and is the world headquarters for breeding pairs.

The new crest was introduced for copyright reasons, to secure the Kerry county board financially. The previous crest, shown on the right, which was used from 1988 to 2011, was based more on Irish and Celtic symbolism, featuring Rattoo Round Tower, an Irish Wolfhound and a harp.

Kit evolution
Kerry traditional colours are gold and green and the county team kits are composed by a green shirt with a single golden hoop, white shorts and green and gold socks. In the early days of the All-Ireland Football Championship, counties were represented by the county champions. Kerry's first representatives were from Laune Rangers, and the blue of Laune Rangers was worn in Kerry's first championship outing in 1889. The royal blue of Laune Rangers were also worn in the 1892 All-Ireland Senior Football Championship Final. Between 1889 and 1895 inclusive, the teams that went forward to represent Kerry were Laune Rangers and Ballymacelligott, who both wore blue.

In the early 20th century, selection committees had been established by the county board, but as Tralee Mitchels dominated the county championship, they had an influential voice in the selection of the team, and the county footballers wore the Mitchels' colours of green and gold.

There are conflicting accounts of the jersey that Kerry wore in the first of the three games of the 1903 All-Ireland Senior Football Championship Final series with Kildare, but both accounts agree that the predominant colour was red. One account says that it was a red jersey with green neck and cuffs, which were the colours of the Tralee Mitchels junior football team. Another account says that it was an entirely red jersey with no green in it. The reason that Kerry wore this red or mainly red jersey was that a new set of green and gold jerseys was not delivered in time for the game. For the later games in the 1903 series of games, Kerry wore green jerseys with gold on the cuffs and over the shoulders. These were the colours of the Tralee Mitchels senior team.

The dominance of players from the Mitchels club on the Kerry team at the point in which they won their first All-Ireland, reinforced the idea that green and gold were the Kerry colours, and they have been Kerry's traditional colours from the 1903 triumph onward. The 'classic' style is green with a gold hoop. The colours have been changed only rarely, most of all in the 80's finals against Offaly to avoid again colour clashes. In the 1939 All-Ireland Senior Football Championship Final Kerry were to play Meath, who also wear green and gold. To avoid a colour clash, Kerry wore the red and white of Dingle, the county champions at the time.

The change kit is usually blue, reflecting the Munster GAA colours.

Team sponsorship
Kerry's inter-county teams are sponsored by the Kerry Group, in one of the longest standing sponsorship arrangements in the GAA. The teams have been connected with the Kerry Group since sponsorship became more open in the GAA in the early 1990s.

Kerry's jerseys are currently provided by O'Neills sportswear. The team kit had been supplied from 1996 to 1998 by Adidas, while prior to that contract in 1998, Kerry were partnered with the now-defunct Millfield brand.

Competitive record
This is Kerry's record in All-Ireland SFC finals. Bold denotes a year in which the team won the competition.

Honours

Kerry has won 38 All-Ireland Senior Football Championships and has been the loser in 23 other All-Ireland SFC finals.

Kerry has also won the most Munster Senior Football Championships, with 83 titles.

National
All-Ireland Senior Football Championship
 Winners (38): 1903, 1904, 1909, 1913, 1914, 1924, 1926, 1929, 1930, 1931, 1932, 1937, 1939, 1940, 1941, 1946, 1953, 1955, 1959, 1962, 1969, 1970, 1975, 1978, 1979, 1980, 1981, 1984, 1985, 1986, 1997, 2000, 2004, 2006, 2007, 2009, 2014, 2022
 Runners-up (23): 1892, 1905, 1910, 1915, 1923, 1927, 1938, 1944, 1947, 1954, 1960, 1964, 1965, 1968, 1972, 1976, 1982, 2002, 2005, 2008, 2011, 2015, 2019
National Football League
 Winners (23): 1927–28, 1928–29, 1930–31, 1931–32, 1958–59, 1960–61, 1962–63, 1968–69,  1970–71, 1971–72, 1972–73, 1973–74, 1976–77, 1981–82, 1983–84, 1996–97, 2004, 2006, 2009, 2017, 2020, 2021 (shared), 2022
 Runners-up (7): 1956–57, 1964–65, 1979–80, 1986–87, 2008, 2016, 2019 
National Football League Division 2
 Winners (1): 2002
All-Ireland Junior Football Championship
 Winners (20): 1913, 1915, 1924, 1928, 1930, 1941, 1949, 1954, 1963, 1967, 1983, 1991, 1994, 2006, 2012, 2015, 2016, 2017, 2018, 2019
All-Ireland Under-21 Football Championship
 Winners (10): 1964, 1973, 1975, 1976, 1977, 1990, 1995, 1996, 1998, 2008
 Runners-up (7): 1967, 1972, 1978, 1987, 1991, 1993, 1999 
All-Ireland Minor Football Championship
 Winners (16): 1931, 1932, 1933, 1946, 1950, 1962, 1963, 1975, 1980, 1988, 1994, 2014, 2015, 2016, 2017, 2018
 Runners-up (13): 1936, 1938, 1949, 1954, 1965, 1970, 1979, 1982, 1990, 1996, 2004, 2006, 2020
All-Ireland Vocational Schools Championship
 Winners (9): 1973, 1977, 1978, 1986, 1987, 1990, 1992, 1993, 1997

Provincial
Munster Senior Football Championship
 Winners (83): 1892, 1903, 1904, 1905, 1908, 1909, 1910, 1912, 1913, 1914, 1915, 1919, 1923, 1924, 1925, 1926, 1927, 1929, 1930, 1931, 1932, 1933, 1934, 1936, 1937, 1938, 1939, 1940, 1941, 1942, 1944, 1946, 1947, 1948, 1950, 1951, 1953, 1954, 1955, 1958, 1959, 1960, 1961, 1962, 1963, 1964, 1965, 1968, 1969, 1970, 1972, 1975, 1976, 1977, 1978, 1979, 1980, 1981, 1982, 1984, 1985, 1986, 1991, 1996, 1997, 1998, 2000, 2001, 2003, 2004, 2005, 2007, 2010, 2011, 2013, 2014, 2015, 2016, 2017, 2018, 2019, 2021, 2022
 Runners-up (24): 1890, 1893, 1900, 1902, 1906, 1918, 1920, 1945, 1952, 1956, 1966, 1967, 1971, 1973, 1974, 1983, 1987, 1988, 1989, 1990, 1992, 1999, 2006, 2008
Munster Football League
 Winners (1): 1926
McGrath Cup
 Winners (5): 1996, 2010, 2011, 2013, 2017
Munster Junior Football Championship
 Winners (46): 1913, 1914, 1915, 1924, 1926, 1927, 1928, 1930, 1931, 1934, 1936, 1938, 1941, 1946, 1947, 1949, 1954, 1956, 1958, 1959, 1960, 1961, 1963, 1965, 1967, 1968, 1969, 1983, 1985, 1991, 1994, 1995, 1997, 2000, 2002, 2003, 2006, 2008, 2010, 2012, 2014, 2015, 2016, 2017, 2018, 2019
Munster Under-21/Under-20 Football Championship (under-20 since 2018)
 Winners (28): 1962, 1964, 1966, 1967, 1968, 1972, 1973, 1975, 1976, 1977, 1978, 1983, 1987, 1988, 1990, 1991, 1992, 1993, 1995, 1996, 1997, 1998, 1999, 2002, 2008, 2017, 2018, 2020
 Runners-up (12): 1963, 1969, 1974, 1981, 1982, 2003, 2004, 2010, 2011, 2012, 2016, 2019 
Munster Minor Football Championship
 Winners (49): 1931, 1932, 1933, 1936, 1937, 1938, 1940, 1941, 1945, 1946, 1947, 1948, 1949, 1950, 1951, 1954, 1957, 1958, 1962, 1963, 1965, 1970, 1975, 1978, 1979, 1980, 1982, 1988, 1989, 1990, 1994, 1996, 1997, 1998, 2001, 2002, 2003, 2004, 2006, 2008, 2009, 2013, 2014, 2015, 2016, 2017, 2018, 2019, 2020
 Runners-up (29): 1939, 1955, 1956, 1959, 1960, 1966, 1967, 1968, 1969, 1971, 1972, 1973, 1974, 1976, 1977, 1981, 1984, 1985, 1986, 1987, 1991, 1992, 1999, 2000, 2005, 2007, 2010, 2012, 2022

References

External links
 Kerry exports representing other counties in 2022 (The42.ie)

 
County football teams